Glen Velez (born 1949) is a four-time Grammy winning American percussionist, vocalist, and composer, specializing in frame drums from around the world. He is largely responsible for the increasing popularity of frame drums in the United States and around the world. Velez is married to Loire.

Biography
Of Mexican American ancestry, Velez was born in Dallas and grew up in Texas but moved to New York City in 1967. He began by playing jazz on the drums but soon gravitated to hand drums from around the world (frame drums in particular), seeking out teachers from many different musical traditions. Among the many instruments Velez favors are the Irish bodhrán, the Brazilian pandeiro, the Arabic riq, the North African bendir, and the Azerbaijani ghaval. Although these instruments are similar in construction, they  have their own playing techniques. Velez has studied each instrument traditionally, but he has also developed his own cross-cultural musical vocabulary, mixing and adapting techniques from various cultures and developing new ones (such as playing the bodhrán with brushes). He has been influential in the growing international interest in frame drums, and many younger players now use his techniques. He teaches percussion and frame drums at Mannes College of Music and The Juilliard School.

He also plays other percussion instruments such as the Venezuelan maracas and steel drum, and is skilled at overtone singing and Konnakol.

Velez's compositions are frequently composed for cross-cultural ensembles in which he himself also performs; he is particularly fond of polyrhythm—superimposing different meters simultaneously.

Velez was a longtime member of the Paul Winter Consort and Steve Reich and Musicians. He has also worked with Layne Redmond, Howard Levy, Steve Gorn, Rabih Abou-Khalil, Pat Metheny, Lyle Mays, Marc Cohn, Suzanne Vega, Glen Moore, Malcolm Dalglish, and Jonas Hellborg .

Velez's students include Layne Redmond, Yousif Sheronick, Shane Shanahan, Glen Fittin, Randy Crafton, and N. Scott Robinson, and Taku Hirano.

Discography

As leader
 1984 Handdance: Frame Drum Music (Nomad)
 1985 Internal Combustion (CMP)
 1985 Radio Iceland (Music of the World)
 1987 Seven Heaven (CMP)
 1989 Assyrian Rose (CMP)
 1990 Ramana (Music of the World)
 1992 Nafas (ECM)
 1993 Songs of Kabir (Interworld)
 1994 Border States (Interworld)
 1994 Doctrine of Signatures (CMP)
 1994 Ettna (Nomad)
 1994 Pan Eros (CMP)
 1994 Temurá (Nuba)
 1996 Rhythmcolor Exotica (Ellipsis Arts)
 1998 Rhythms of the Chakras (Sounds True)
 2000 Breathing Rhythms (Sounds True)
 2000 Kinship (Koch)
 2005 Elephant Hotel
 2005 Rhythms of Awakening
 2008 Rhythms Of The Chakras Volume 2

As sideman
With Steve Reich
 1978 Steve Reich: Music for 18 Musicians
 1980 Steve Reich: Octet; Music for a Large Ensenble; Violin Phase
 1985 Steve Reich: The Desert Music Steve Reich/Michael Tilson Thomas
 1986 Steve Reich: Sextet; Six Marimbas
 1998 Music for 18 Musicians
 2002 Steve Reich: Variations, Six Pianos Etc.
 2003 Steve Reich: Drumming

With Paul Winter
 1983 Sun Singer
 1985 Canyon Consort
 1985 Canyon
 1985 Concert for the Earth
 1987 Earthbeat
 1990 Earth: Voices of a Planet
 1992 Anthems
 1994 Prayer for the Wild Things
 1995 Man Who Planted Trees
 1993 Solstice Live!
 1993 Spanish Angel (Recorded Live in Spain)
 2005 Silver Solstice
 2007 Crestone

With Malcolm Dalglish
 1991 Dalglish: Hymnody of Earth
 1997 Pleasure
 2003 Carpe Diem! A Ceremony of Song

With Peter Kater
 1991 Homage
 1999 Birds of Prey
 2013 Heart of the Universe

With Paul Sullivan
 1987 Sketches of Maine
 1988 A Visit to the Rockies
 1992 Christmas in Maine

With Marc Cohn
 1991 Marc Cohn
 1993 The Rainy Season

With David Lanz
 1998 Songs from an English Garden
 2005 Spirit Romance

With Patty Larkin
 1993 Angels Running
 1995 Strangers World

With Rabih Abou-Khalil

 1988 Nafas (ECM)
 1994 Between Dusk and Dawn
 1994 Bukra
 1994 Roots & Sprouts

With others
 1987 New York Counterpoint, Richard Stoltzman
 1988 Basic Tendencies, Mike Richmond
 1988 Memos from Paradise, Eddie Daniels
 1988 Street Dreams, Lyle Mays
 1989 Arms Around You, Eugene Friesen
 1990 Days of Open Hand, Suzanne Vega
 1990 Strange Omen, Michael Cain
 1991 Angel on a Stone Wall, Paul Halley
 1994 Ettna, Enzo Rao
 1995 Ars Moriende, Jonas Hellborg
 1994 Rhymes With Orange, Mario Grigorov
 1994 Trio Globo, Trio Globo
 1995 Carnival of Souls, Trio Globo
 1995 On the Cliffs of the Heart, David Rothenberg
 1995 Power Lines, Ned Rothenberg
 1995 Istanpitta, Vol. 1: A Medieval Dance Band, New York Ensemble for Early Music
 1996 Istanpitta, Vol. 2: Medieval Dances, New York Ensemble for Early Music
 1996 Celtic Soul, Nóirín Ní Riain
 1996 Song of the Irish Whistle, Joanie Madden
 1996 Closer to Far Away, Douglas Spotted Eagle
 1996 Layers of Time, Reinhard Flatischler
 1996 Little Magic in a Noisy World, Nguyên Lê
 1997 Clara Ponty, Clara Ponty
 1997 End of the Summer, Dar Williams
 1997 Imaginary Day, Pat Metheny
 1997 One in the Pocket, Badal Roy
 1998 Sea of Dreams, Davy Spillane
 1998 Shy Angels, Sussan Deyhim
 2000 Madman of God, Sussan Deyhim
 2000 Tarantata: Dance of the Ancient Spider, Alessandra Belloni
 2002 Gypsy Killer, Sanda Weigl
 2007 Celtic Grace, Aureole Trio
 2015 Amaryllis, Nina Stern

Video
 Canyon Consort, Paul Winter (A&M/Windham Hill Video, 1985)
 Ancient Altars, New Forms, Marion Scott & Rene Olivas Gubernick (New York Public Library Dance Collection, 1986)
 World Drums, Niv Fichman (director) (National Film Board of Canada, 1986)
 C.O.C.A., Manuel Alum Dance Company soundtrack compilation (New York Public Library Dance Collection, 1988)
 Drumbeats Glen Velez (REMO, 1989)
 The Fantastic World of Frame Drums, Glen Velez (Interworld, 1990)
 Mountain Gorilla (IMAX film, 1992), Various Artists
 Noah and the Ark: The Classic Story of Noah's Ark, Paul Winter (Rabbit Ears Productions, 1992)
 Hymnody of Earth (revised), Malcolm Dalglish (KET, 1993)
 Back to Nature – Live in Zagreb, Paul Winter (Croatian TV, 1994)
 The Snowbird Cherokees Richard Panter, (producer) soundtrack compilation (South Carolina, 1995)
 Handance Method 1, Glen Velez (Interworld/Warner Bros., 1996)
 Handance Method 2, Glen Velez (Interworld/Warner Bros., 1996)
 The Selchie and the Fisherman, Malcolm Dalglish (Live Multimedia, 1997)
 Modern Drummer Festival Weekend, Various Artists (Warner Bros., 1998)
 Wendigo, Larry Fessenden (director) soundtrack (Magnolia Pictures, 2003)

Published scores 
 "Composed Improvisation for One-sided Drum with or without Jangles," for Glen Velez, composed by John Cage, New York Public Library Music Division Research Collection, c. early 1980s.
 "Hymnody of Earth: A Celebration of Songs for Choir, Hammer Dulcimer, and Percussion" (Revised) composed and arranged by Malcolm Dalglish, poetry by Wendell Berry, percussion parts by Glen Velez. Published in Ft. Lauderdale by Plymouth Music Co., MDP-900, 1995.

Articles/interviews/books 
 Berendt, Joachim E. and Gunther Huesmann. The Jazz Book: From Ragtime to Fusion to Beyond. Brooklyn: Lawrence Hill Books, 1992, 6th edition, 358.
 Blank-Edelman, David N. "Glen Velez: A Unified Approach to the Frame Drum." RhythmMusic Magazine 3, no. 8 (1994): 38-43.
 . "Glen Velez: From South India to Azerbaijan, Velez Finds a Unified Approach to the Frame Drum." Percussion Source 1, no. 1 (1995): 10-12.
 Brooks, Iris. "Global Beat: World Drum Festival." Ear: Magazine of New Music 2, no. 3 (November 1986): 8.
 . "The World Drum Festival." Modern Percussionist 3, no. 1 (December/February 1986/1987): 14-17, 37, 39.
 . "Meet the Composer: Glen Velez." Ear: Magazine of New Music 12, no. 6 (1987): 16-19.
 . "Around the World: Glen Velez." Modern Drummer 11, no. 9 (September 1988): 76-79.
 . "Glen Velez: Hands Dancing." Jazziz 8 (August 1995): 60, 61, 63, 65, 67.
 . "Colors & Scents: Glen Velez Draws Inspiration From the World Around Him." Drum! 6, no. 1 (1997): 75-78.
 . "Glen Velez: Embodies the Essence of Rhythm." Drum! 10, no. 2 (March/April 2001): 67-68, 70, 72, 74, 76, 132.
 Browning, Robert (editor). "Kavkazi," in Maqam: Music of the Islamic World and its Influences. New York: Alternative Museum, 1984, 40.
 Dalglish, Malcolm with Glen Velez. Hymnody of Earth: A Ceremony of Songs for Choir, Hammer Dulcimer and Percussion [revised]. Ft. Lauderdale: Plymouth Music, 1995.
 Dorsey, Ed. "Ethnic Percussion: An Interview with Glen Velez." Percussive Notes 25, no. 4 (Spring 1987): 56-60.
 Dorsey, Ed, Iris Brooks and Antonio Gentile. "Glen Velez." Percussioni 7, no. 60 (January 1996): 12-16.
 Graham, Richard. "Glen Velez's Tambourines." Modern Percussionist 2, no. 1 (December/February 1985/1986): 48-50.
 Johnson, Tom. "Music: The Real Tambourine Man." The Village Voice 26 (11 March 1981): 70.
 . The Voice of New Music: New York City, 1972-1982: A Collection of Articles Originally Published in The Village Voice. Eindholen: Apollohuis, 1989, 469-472.
 Kwan-uk, Hyun (photographer). "Expo '93: The Culture of Science, The Science of Culture."
 Koreana: Korean Art and Culture (Summer 1993): 40-41 (appears in photo only – International Drum Festival 1993).
 Li Castro, Emiliano and Fabrizio Dadò. "I tamburi a cornice di Glen Velez." Percussioni 2, no. 6 (February 1991): 36-39.
 Lieberman, Julie Lyonn. Planet Musician: The World Music Sourcebook for Musicians. Milwaukee: Hal Leonard, 1998, 6, 68.
 Liss, Dan. "Music: Framing a New Sound." Aquarius 4, no. 12 (1997): 14.
 . "New Perspectives in Rhythms: An Interview with Glen Velez." New Age Voice 4, no. 7 (August 1998): 16, 18.
 Moscov, Josh. "Glen Velez: Exploring Where East Meets West." Drum! 1, no. 6 (July/August 1992): 25-27.
 Robinson, N. Scott. "Glen Velez: World Music Total." Batera & Percussão 3, no. 28 (December 1999): 30-32.
 . "Glen Velez: A World of Sound in His Hands." Modern Drummer 24, no. 4 (April 2000): 72-76, 78-80, 82, 84, 86.
 . The New Percussionist in Jazz: Organological and Technical Expansion. Masters Thesis, Kent State University, 2002.
 . "Frame Drums and Tambourines," in Continuum Encyclopedia of Popular Music of the World, Volume Two: Performance and Production. Edited by John Shepherd, David Horn, Dave Laing, Paul Oliver, and Peter Wicke. New York: Continuum, 2003, 362-372.
 Schaefer, John. New Sounds: A Listener's Guide to World Music. New York: Harper & Row, 1987, 130, 132.
 Sofia, Sal. "The World Drum Festival." Percussioner International 2, no. 1 (1987): 66-72.
 Solca, Alex. "Highlights of Modern Drummer's 1998 Festival Weekend." Modern Drummer 22, no. 10 (1998): 110-111.
 Tolleson, Robin. "Riffs: Glen Velez." DownBeat 58 (November 1991): 14.
 Velez, Glen. "The Tambourine in Ancient Western Asia." Ear Magazine East 5, no. 5 (April/May 1980): 3.
 . "A Monograph on the Frame Drum, Ancestor of our Modern Tambourine." Ear Magazine East 7, no. 3/4 (April/October 1982): 8-9.
 . Handance Duets for Frame Drums. New York: Framedrum Music, 2001.
 . Handance Method with Cueing and Performance Guide: An Introduction to Frame Drumming. New York: Framedrum Music, 2002.
 . Bodhran Instruction Manual. New York: Frame Drum Music, 2004.
 . Shakers Instruction Manual. New York: Frame Drum Music, 2004.
 . Tar Instruction Manual. New York: Frame Drum Music, 2004.
 Wentz, Brooke. "An Interview With Glen Velez." Op Magazine V (1984): 42-43.

References

External links 
 Official site
 "Glen Velez: A World of Sound in His Hands", by N. Scott Robinson (from Modern Drummer 24, no. 4 (April 2000), pp. 72–76, 78-80, 82, 84, and 86)

1949 births
Living people
American musicians of Mexican descent
American percussionists
Bodhrán players
Contemporary classical music performers
Frame drum players
Maracas players
Musicians from Dallas
Paul Winter Consort members
Steelpan musicians
Place of birth missing (living people)